Mar'Keise "Bucky" Irving (born August 19, 2002) is an American football running back for the Oregon Ducks. He previously played for the Minnesota Golden Gophers.

High school career
Irving attended Hillcrest High School in Country Club Hills, Illinois. He did not play football his senior year in 2020 due to the Covid-19 pandemic. He finished his high school career with 3,264 rushing yards. Irving committed to the University of Minnesota to play college football.

College career
As a true freshman at Minnesota in 2021, Irving rushed 133 times for 699 yards and four touchdowns. After the season, he transferred to the University of Oregon. In his first year at Oregon in 2022, he split time with Noah Whittington.

References

External links
Oregon Ducks bio

Living people
Players of American football from Chicago
American football running backs
Minnesota Golden Gophers football players
Oregon Ducks football players
Year of birth missing (living people)